Cultural heritage tourism (or just heritage tourism) is a branch of tourism oriented towards the cultural heritage of the location where tourism is occurring.
The National Trust for Historic Preservation in the United States defines heritage tourism as "traveling to experience the places, artifacts and activities that authentically represent the stories and people of the past", and "heritage tourism can include cultural, historic and  natural resources".

Culture
Culture has always been a major part of travel, as the development of the Grand Tour from the 16th century onwards attests. In the 20th century, some people have claimed, culture ceased to be the objective of tourism; tourism is now culture. Cultural attractions play an important role in tourism at all levels, from the global highlights of world culture to attractions that underpin local identities.

Culture, heritage and the arts have long contributed to appeal of tourist destination. However, in recent years 'culture' has been rediscovered as an important marketing tool to attract those travellers with special interests in heritage and arts.

According to the Hollinshead, cultural heritage tourism defines as cultural heritage tourism is the fastest growing segment of the tourism industry because there is a trend toward an increase specialization among tourists. This trend is evident in the rise in the volume of tourists who seek adventure, culture, history, archaeology and interaction with local people.

Cultural heritage tourism is important for various reasons; it has a positive economic and social impact, it establishes and reinforces identity, it helps preserve the cultural heritage, with culture as an instrument it facilitates harmony and understanding among people, it supports culture and helps renew tourism. As Benjamin 
Porter and Noel B. Salazar have ethnographically documented, however, cultural heritage tourism can also create tensions and even conflict between the different stakeholders involved.

Cultural heritage tourism has a number of objectives that must be met within the context of sustainable development such as; the conservation of cultural resources, accurate  interpretation of resources, authentic visitors experience, and the stimulation of the earned revenues of cultural resources. We can see, therefore, that cultural heritage tourism is not only concerned with identification, management and protection of the heritage values but it must also be involved in understanding the impact of tourism on communities and regions, achieving economic and social benefits, providing financial resources for protection, as well as marketing and promotion. (J. M. Fladmark, 1994)

Heritage tourism involves visiting historical or industrial sites that may include old canals, railways, battlegrounds, military sites, etc. The overall purpose is to gain an appreciation of the past.

For example, Gopal Neelkanth Dandekar, a renowned Marathi writer, used to arrange hiking tours to forts in Maharashtra, to explore the sights closely linked to Chhatrapati Shivaji Maharaj and his achievements.

Immigration
Decolonization and immigration form the major background of much contemporary heritage tourism. Falling travel costs have also made heritage tourism possible for more people.

Another possible form involves religious travel or pilgrimages. Many Catholics from around the world come to the Vatican and other sites such as Lourdes or Fátima. Islam commands its followers to take the hajj to Mecca, thus differentiating it somewhat from tourism in the usual sense, though the trip can also be a culturally important event for the pilgrim.

Heritage tourism can also be attributed to historical events that have been dramatised to make them more entertaining. For example, a historical tour of a town or city using a theme such as ghosts or Vikings. Heritage tourism focuses on certain historical events, rather than presenting a balanced view of that historical period. Its aim may not always be the presentation of accurate historical facts, as opposed to economically developing the site and surrounding area. As a result, heritage tourism can be seen as a blend of education, entertainment, preservation and profit.

Indigenous peoples
Anthropology and Ethnology were two major disciplines interested by the life of aborigines, their customs and political structures. Although the first fieldworkers were not interested in expanding the colonization of main European powers, the fact was that their notes, books and field-work were employed by colonial officials to understand the aboriginal mind. From that moment on, anthropology developed a strange fascination for the Other's culture. The concepts of heritage and colonization were inextricably intertwined.

Another problem with heritage tourism is the effect on indigenous peoples whose land and culture is being visited by tourists. If the indigenous people are not a part of the majority, or ruling power in the country, they may not benefit from the tourism as greatly as they should. For example, in Mexico tourism has increased because of the predicted end of the Maya Calendar. However, some activists claim the indigenous Maya are not benefitting from the increased traffic through the ruins and other cultural landmarks.

Cultural tourism

Promotion and facilitation 
Heritage tourism is supported by municipalities through promotion and tourist information in many countries and their administrative units, e.g. cities such as the Polish Bydgoszcz or Warsaw.

There are also many forms of presenting selected tourist topics in a harmonized way, for instance European Route of Brick Gothic and many others (Cultural Route of the Council of Europe).

See also
 Heritage interpretation
 List of heritage railways
 World Heritage Site
 Genealogy tourism
 Dark tourism

Notes

External links

Cultural heritage
Cultural tourism
Museology
Articles containing video clips
Types of tourism